Storm Online (Simplified Chinese: 风云; Traditional Chinese: 雄霸天下; Russian: Поднебесье) is a free-to-play 2.5D fantasy MMORPG (Massively Multiplayer Online Role-Playing Game), developed by Chengdu Aurora Technology Development Co.Ltd, first launched in China in July 2007. It was well received in Taiwan when launched in May 2008 by Unalis Co. Ltd and Pili puppets were used as to endorse the game.

The launch of the first English version was scheduled to be on November 2010 by Shanda Games from its international office in Singapore.

Gameplay

Backed by the rich background story of Storm Online, the tension and hostility from warring nations means constant PVP opportunities for thrill-seekers while an abundance of exciting quests.

Classes

There are 3 gender-locked classes in Storm Online.

 Warrior  Male, uses Falchion and long swords. Strong tanker and engager with melee DPS with AOE stun. Job advancement between Swordsmanship and Art of Saber.
 Mage  Male, uses Staff to yield high DPS with AOE skills. Job advancement between Fire mage, Thunderbolt mage and Three Realm of Eternity.
 Hunter  Female, uses Bow and Crossbow. Healer with AOE skill. A versatile class that can fulfill both support and attack roles. Job advancement between Auxiliary, Archer and Crossbow.

Kingdoms

 Fiery Sky  Descendants of the Devil, Militaristic, Ruthless
 Encroaching Winds  Neutral nation, Cautious, Distrusts Other Nations
 Vast Clouds  Vengeful, Courageous, Dislikes Stable Earth
 Stable Earth  Loyal to the Gods, Loyal, Honourable

Quest

Storm Online is not a grind feast MMORPG. There are main line quests known as Plot Quest; tasks that are interlinked with a storyline. Different Plot Quests would be unlocked when certain level is achieved. A red flag in the mini map signifies an available quest in the location.

References

External links
 风云-诸神之战 - Official site of Storm Online in China
 Поднебесье - Official site of Storm Online in Russia
 雄霸天下-闇獄狂龍 - Official site of Storm Online in Taiwan
 Storm Online - Official site of Storm Online in South East Asia

2007 video games
Fantasy massively multiplayer online role-playing games
Video games developed in China
Windows games
Windows-only games